Van Trump is a surname.

People with this surname include:

 Jessalyn Van Trump (1887–1939), American silent film actress
 Philadelph Van Trump (1810–1874), U.S. Representative from Ohio
 P. B. Van Trump (Philemon Beecher Van Trump; 1839–1916), American mountaineer
 Rebecca Newbold Van Trump (1839–1935), American painter
 R. V. Truitt (Reginald Van Trump Truitt; 1890–1991), American zoologist and lacrosse player

See also
Trump (surname)
Van Trump (disambiguation)